Morris Davis or Davies may refer to:

Morris "Moe" Davis, US officer and attorney
Morris Davis (composer)
Morris Harold Davis (1894–1985), British politician
Morris Davies, see 1861 in Wales

See also
Maurice Davis (disambiguation)
Maurice Davies (disambiguation)